Irish DreamTime is a production company founded by actor Pierce Brosnan and his partner Beau St. Clair.

After many of the names he considered for the production company were already taken Brosnan recalled the Australian Aborigines concept of Dreamtime and adapted that into the company name.

Films

References

External links
 

Film production companies of the United States